Confessions are acknowledgements of facts by those who would have otherwise preferred to keep those facts hidden.

Confessions may also refer to:

Film, television, and radio
 Confessions (1925 film), a British silent film
 Confessions (2010 film), a Japanese film
 The Confessions (film) (Le confessioni), a 2016 Italian film
 Confessions series, a 1970s series of film adaptations of novels by Christopher Wood
 "Confessions" (Arrow), a 2019 television episode
 "Confessions" (Breaking Bad), a 2013 television episode
 "Confessions" (Roseanne), a 1990 television episode
 Confessions (radio programme), a British radio feature presented by Simon Mayo

Literature
 Confessions (Augustine), a 4th-century autobiographical work by St. Augustine of Hippo
 Confession (Bakunin), an 1851 autobiographical work by Mikhail Bakunin
 Confessions (Rousseau), a 1782–1789 autobiography by Jean-Jacques Rousseau
 Confessions series, a 1970s series of novels by Christopher Wood, and their film adaptations

Music
 Confessions, a 2008 song cycle by Teitur Lassen and Nico Muhly
 Confessions Tour, a 2006 concert tour by Madonna

Albums
 Confessions (Alesana album), 2015
 Confessions (Buckcherry album), 2013
 Confessions (Liza Minnelli album), 2010
 Confessions (Pillar album), 2009
 Confessions (Usher album), 2004
 Confessions, by Aurea, 2018
 Confessions, by Dweezil Zappa, 1991
 Confessions, by Mary's Blood, 2019
 Confessions, an EP by Escape the Day, 2014

Songs
 "Confessions" (Lecrae song), 2012
 "Confessions", by Cubsport from Like Nirvana, 2020
 "Confessions", by Destiny's Child from The Writing's on the Wall, 1999
 "Confessions", by tha Mexakinz from Tha Mexakinz, 1996
 "Confessions", by Slipknot from Mate. Feed. Kill. Repeat., 1996

See also
 
 
 Confession (disambiguation)